KCB Bank Uganda Limited, also KCB Bank Uganda, is a commercial bank in Uganda. It is licensed by the Bank of Uganda, the central bank and national banking regulator.

Location
Te headquarters of KCB Bank Uganda are located at Commercial Plaza Complex, 7 Kampala Road, in the central business district of Kampala, Uganda's capital city. The geographical coordinates of the bank's headquarters are: 0°18'46.0"N, 32°35'12.0"E (Latitude:0.312778; Longitude:32.586667).

Overview
KCB Bank Uganda focuses on meeting the banking needs of individuals, corporate entities and small to medium enterprises. As of 31 December 2018, KCB Uganda had assets of KES:18.77 billion (US$176 million).

Kenya Commercial Bank Group
Kenya Commercial Bank Uganda is a wholly owned subsidiary of the KCB Group, a financial services conglomerate, headquartered in Nairobi, Kenya, with subsidiaries in Kenya, Tanzania, Rwanda, South Sudan, Burundi and Uganda, with a representative office in Ethiopia. The shares of stock of KCB Group are listed on the Nairobi Stock Exchange and are cross-listed on the Uganda Securities Exchange under the symbol: KCB As of 30 June 2019, KCB Group had total assets of KES:746.51 billion (US$7.46 billion).

History
In November 2007, the first branch of KCB Bank Uganda opened in Kampala, Uganda's capital city, following licensing by the Bank of Uganda. Since then, the bank has opened fifteen more branches in the country. In November 2017, the bank marked 10 years of presence in the country. At that time, KCB had sixteen branches, eight of them in Kampala and eight others in major cities and towns around Uganda.

Branch network
As of July 2020, KCB Uganda had sixteen branches in all the regions of Uganda, including at the following locations.

 Arua Branch - Arua
 Gulu Branch - Gulu
 Lira Branch - Lira
 Fort Portal Branch - Fort Portal
 Jinja Branch - Jinja
 Hoima Branch - Hoima
 Kampala Road Branch — Kampala Road, Kampala Main Branch
 Ben Kiwanuka Branch — Ben Kiwanuka Street, Kampala
 Luwum Street Branch — Luwum Street, Kampala
 Sixth Street Branch — Sixth Street, Industrial Area, Kampala
 Oasis Mall Branch — Oasis Mall, Kampala Central Division, Kampala
 Ndeeba Branch - Ndeeba, Kampala
 Mbale Branch - Mbale
 Mbarara Branch - High Street, Mbarara
 Kikuubo Branch - Kikuubo - Kampala
 Forest Mall Branch - Forest Mall, Lugogo Bypass, Kampala

Governance
As of May 2021, the chairman of the board of directors is Constant Othieno Mayende. The managing director is Edgar Byamah.

See also

 Banking in Uganda
 List of banks in Uganda

References

External links
 KCB Group Homepage
 KCB Uganda Homepage
 East African Branches of Kenyan Banks Post Record Profits
 Banks in 2019: Gap between highfliers and strugglers widens As of 7 May 2019.

Banks of Uganda
Companies based in Kampala
2007 establishments in Uganda
Banks established in 2007
KCB Group